In the Domain Name System (DNS) hierarchy, a second-level domain (SLD or 2LD) is a domain that is directly below a top-level domain (TLD).

Second-level domains commonly refer to the organization that registered the domain name with a domain name registrar. Some domain name registries introduce a second-level hierarchy to a TLD that indicates the type of entity intended to register an SLD under it. For example, in the .uk namespace a college or other academic institution would register under the  ccSLD, while companies would register under . Strictly speaking, domains like .ac.uk and .co.uk are second level domain themselves, since they are right below a TLD. A list of the official TLDs can be found at icann.org and iana.org. An ordinal-free term to denote domains under which people can register their own domain name is public suffix domain (PSD).

Country-code second-level domains

Algeria

Australia

Austria 

In Austria there are two second-level domains available for the public: 
.co.at intended for commercial enterprises 
.or.at intended for organizations.
The second-level domain 
.priv.at is restricted to Austrian citizens only, while 
.ac.at and .gv.at are reserved for educational institutions and governmental bodies respectively.

Brazil

France 

In France, there are various second-level domains available for certain sectors, including 
.avocat.fr for attorneys, 
.aeroport.fr for airports and 
.veterinaire.fr for vets.

Hungary

New Zealand

Nigeria 

 .com.ng
 .gov.ng

Pakistan

India

Israel

Japan

Russia

South Africa

South Korea

Spain

Sri Lanka

Thailand

Trinidad and Tobago 

 co.tt
 com.tt
 org.tt
 net.tt

 travel.tt 
 museum.tt 
 aero.tt 
 tel.tt 
 name.tt
 charity.tt
 mil.tt
 edu.tt
 gov.tt

Turkey 

In Turkey, domain registrations, including the registration of second-level domains is administrated by nic.tr.
There 17 active second-level domains under the .tr TLD. The registration of domains is restricted to Turkish individuals and businesses, or foreign companies with a business activity in Turkey.
Second-level domains include .com.tr for commercial ventures, .edu.tr for academic institutions and .name.tr for personal use.

Ukraine 

Ukraine second-level domains include:
.gov.ua – available for government agencies.
.com.ua – for commercial use.
.in.ua – for commercial use.
.org.ua – intended for non-profit organizations.
.net.ua – intended for Internet providers.
.edu.ua – for academic institutions.

There are also numerous geographic names.

United Kingdom

United States 

A two-letter second-level domain is formally reserved for each U.S. state, federal territory, and the District of Columbia.

Zambia

Historic second-level domains 
There are several second-level domains which are no longer available.

Australia 

Canada 
Prior to 12 Oct 2010 there were second level domain based on province:
.ab.ca — Alberta, .bc.ca — British Columbia, .mb.ca — Manitoba, .nb.ca — New Brunswick, .nf.ca — Newfoundland, .nl.ca — Newfoundland and Labrador, .ns.ca — Nova Scotia, .nt.ca — Northwest Territories, .nu.ca — Nunavut, .on.ca — Ontario, .pe.ca — Prince Edward Island, .qc.ca — Quebec, .sk.ca — Saskatchewan, .yk.ca — Yukon 

Since 2010, some have been replaced (for example, alberta.ca) while others have remained under the provincial two letter SLD (e.g., Calgary Board of Education www.cbe.ab.ca) and others were moved to more traditional subdomains (www.transportation.alberta.ca).

France 
Historic second-level domains for France included:

The Netherlands 
Historic second-level domains for the Netherlands included:
.co.nl (for commercial use)

Yugoslavia 
Second-level domains under  included:
Only legal entities were allowed to register names under  and its second-level domains.

Tuvalu 
Historic second-level domains for Tuvalu included:
co.tv

Legal issues 
As a result of ICANN's generic top-level domain (gTLD) expansion, the risk of domain squatting has increased significantly.
Experts say  that further restrictions are needed for second-level domains under the new gTLD , as well. For example, second-level domains under  or  can be easily misused by companies and therefore are a potential threat to Internet users.

See also
Single-letter second-level domains
Domain Name System
Top-level domain
Country code top-level domain
Subdomain
Private sub-domain registry
Public Suffix List
.ac (second-level domain)
.edu (second-level domain)

References

Domain Name System